Paul Lloyd Martini (born November 2, 1960 in Weston, Ontario) is a Canadian former pair skater. With partner Barbara Underhill, he is the 1979–1983 Canadian national champion, the 1984 World champion, and the 1978 World Junior champion. They represented Canada at the 1980 Winter Olympics, where they placed 9th, and at the 1984 Winter Olympics, where they placed 7th.  Less than a month after the 1984 Olympics, they redeemed themselves by winning the World Championship in Ottawa.  After that competition, they began an lengthy and successful professional career.

Competitive highlights
(with Underhill)

References

External links

Pairs on Ice: Barbara Underhill & Paul Martini

Canadian male pair skaters
Olympic figure skaters of Canada
Figure skaters at the 1980 Winter Olympics
Figure skaters at the 1984 Winter Olympics
1960 births
Living people
People from Weston, Toronto
Figure skaters from Toronto
World Figure Skating Championships medalists
World Junior Figure Skating Championships medalists